First Love may refer to:

Film and television

Film
 First Love (1921 film), an American silent film by Maurice Campbell
 First Love (1939 film), an American musical by Henry Koster
 First Love (1941 film), an Italian film by Carmine Gallone
 First Love (1959 film), an Italian film by Mario Camerini
 First Love (1970 film), a film by Maximilian Schell
 First Love (1973 film) or Cinta Pertama, an Indonesian film by Teguh Karya
 First Love, a 1974 film by Krzysztof Kieślowski
 First Love (1977 film), an American film by Joan Darling
 First Love (1978 film), an Italian film by Dino Risi
 First Love (2000 film), a Japanese film by Tetsuo Shinohara
 First Love (2004 Italian film), a film by Matteo Garrone and Massimo Gaudioso
 First Love (2004 documentary film), a concert film documenting the Jesus music movement
 First Love (2006 film) or Cinta Pertama, an Indonesian film by Nayato Fio Nuala
 First Love (2010 Nepali film), a film by Simosh Sunuwar
 First Love (2010 Thai film), a film by Puttipong Pormsaka Na-Sakonnakorn and Wasin Pokpong
 First Love (2018 film), a Philippine film by Paul Soriano
 First Love (2019 film), a Japanese film by Takashi Miike

Television
 First Love (1954 TV series), an American soap opera
 First Love (1992 TV series) or Första Kärleken, a Swedish miniseries
 First Love (1996 TV series), a South Korean drama
 First Love (2004 TV series) or Pierwsza miłość, a Polish soap opera
 First Love (2022 TV series) or First Love Hatsukoi, a Japanese Netflix series

Literature
 First Love (novella), an 1860 novella by Ivan Turgenev
 First Love (play), a 1795 play by Richard Cumberland
 First Love (short story), a 1946 story by Samuel Beckett
 First Love: A Gothic Tale, a 1996 novella by Joyce Carol Oates
 First Love, a 2014 novel by James Patterson with Emily Raymond
 First Love Illustrated, a 1949–1963 comic book published by Harvey Comics
 "First Love", a short story by Vladimir Nabokov included in the 1968 collection Nabokov's Congeries
 "First Love", a poem by John Clare

Music

Albums
 First Love (After School single album) or the title song, 2013
 First Love (Emmy the Great album) or the title song (see below), 2009
 First Love (Hikaru Utada album) or the title song (see below), 1999
 First Love (Karina Pasian album) or the title song, 2008
 First Love (Lee Hi album), 2013
 First Love (Yiruma album), 2001
 First Love (EP), by CLC, or the title song, 2015
 First Love, by Bryn Terfel, 2008
 First Love, by Julie Vega, or the title song, 1985
 First Love, by Kathleen Battle, 1993
 First Love, by Paul Baloche, 1998

Songs
 "First Love" (Emmy the Great song), 2009
 "First Love" (Hikaru Utada song), 1999
 "First Love" (Jennifer Lopez song), 2014
 "First Love" (Lost Kings song), 2017
 "First Love" (The Maccabees song), 2006
 "First Love" (Uffie song), 2007
 "First Love", by Adele from 19, 2008
 "First Love", by Billie Piper, B-side of "Something Deep Inside", 2000
 "First Love", by BTS from Wings, 2016
 "First Love", by Dala from Best Day, 2012
 "First Love", by Exo from Love Me Right, 2015
 "First Love", by Kodak Black from Project Baby 2, 2017
 "First Love", by Nikka Costa, 1983
 "First Love", by Stryper from Soldiers Under Command, 1985

Other uses
 First Love, a custom car, winner of the 2007 Ridler Award

See also